The red-throated tit (Melaniparus fringillinus) is a species of bird in the family Paridae.
It is found in Kenya and Tanzania.
Its natural habitat is dry savanna.

The red-throated tit was formerly one of the many species in the genus Parus but was moved to Melaniparus after a molecular phylogenetic analysis published in 2013 showed that the members of the new genus formed a distinct clade.

References

red-throated tit
Birds of East Africa
red-throated tit
Taxonomy articles created by Polbot